The following is a list of stadiums that are either proposed or under construction, with "stadium" defined as a venue that can accommodate sports traditionally held outdoors. The list does not include indoor arenas under construction, some of which can be found at List of indoor arenas by capacity. Entirely new stadiums under construction on the same site as a demolished former stadium, plus those planned to be built on the site of a current stadium, are included. However, expansions to already-existing stadiums are not included, and neither are recently constructed venues which have opened, even though construction continues on part of the stadium.

List

See also
 List of stadiums
 List of stadiums by capacity
 List of closed stadiums by capacity
 List of sports venues by capacity

Footnotes

References

External links
worldstadiums.com - Future Stadiums (Please note that this list also includes proposed stadiums which are not yet under construction)
Atlas of worldwide soccer stadiums for GoogleEarth ***NEW***
Stadium Index of Turkey
Türkiye'deki Stadyumlar

Future

Stadiums under construction
Stadiums under construction